A putter is a club used in the sport of golf.

Putter may also refer to:

People:
 Pütter, a short list of people with the surname
 Andries Putter (1936-2014), South African vice admiral, twice Chief of the South African Navy
 Eddy Putter (born 1982), Dutch football player
 Putter Smith (born 1941), American jazz bassist

Other uses:
 Putter (mining), a miner who pushes ore trucks around the mine
 Pütter See, a lake in Mecklenburg-Vorpommern, Germany

See also
 de Putter